John James Ormiston (9 November 1880 – 1 March 1917) was a Scottish amateur footballer who played in the Scottish League for Queen's Park as a right half.

Personal life 
Ormiston was educated at Queen's Park Secondary School and the Royal College of Science and Technology and later worked as an analytical chemist. He emigrated to Canada prior to 1911 and after the outbreak of the First World War in 1914, he enlisted in the 75th Battalion (Mississauga), CEF under the assumed name "John Armstrong". Ormiston was killed on Vimy Ridge on 1 March 1917 and was buried in Villers Station Cemetery, Villers-au-Bois.

Career statistics

References 

Scottish footballers
Queen's Park F.C. players
Scottish Football League players
1880 births
1917 deaths
Association football wing halves
Footballers from Glasgow
Scottish emigrants to Canada
Canadian Expeditionary Force soldiers
Canadian military personnel killed in World War I
People educated at Queen's Park Secondary School
Military personnel from Glasgow